Wisconsin State College of Milwaukee was a predecessor institution of the University of Wisconsin–Milwaukee.

Founded in 1885 as Wisconsin State Normal School, it became Wisconsin State Teachers College-Milwaukee in 1927, and Wisconsin State College–Milwaukee in 1951. Originally at a downtown site, the Normal School subsequently moved to the Lakeside campus. In 1956, it became part of the then University of Wisconsin, and subsequently the University of Wisconsin–Milwaukee's primary (Eastside) campus.

History

Wisconsin State Normal School at Milwaukee opened for classes in 1885 in a specially constructed building on the corner of 18th and Wells streets, with six teachers and 46 students. At the beginning, it was a normal school: a teacher preparation school for Milwaukee's soaring population at that time. After the turn of the 20th century, the school introduced several new areas of study including liberal arts and music education. In 1909, the school moved to the new Kenwood campus, on which had been erected a single building which would later be named Mitchell Hall. The north wing opened three years later. The original building is now used as the Milwaukee Rescue Mission. After moving to the new site, the school also began to offer even wider curriculum including agriculture, home economics, commerce, journalism, pre-medical and pre-law. The broadened curriculum proved to be popular and accounted for over one-third of the enrollment. Wisconsin State Normal School continued to grow after absorbing the Milwaukee School of Art and, in 1913, the school of music.

The broadened curriculum, however, was attacked by the Carnegie Endowment for the Advancement of Teachers, arguing that normal schools should not stray from their role as trainers of teachers. In 1922, the State Normal School Regents voted to discontinue college courses in an effort to refocus on the instruction of teachers. The Wisconsin State Normal School then began to offer education-related four year degrees. In 1927, the Wisconsin State Normal School changed its name to the Wisconsin State Teachers' College-Milwaukee, popularly known as "Milwaukee State." Known for its innovative and experimental programs in teacher education, the Wisconsin State Teacher's College was a national prominence at that time and was considered one of the top teacher training colleges in the nation by the 1940s.

In 1951, when the Legislature empowered all state colleges to offer liberal arts programs, Wisconsin State Teachers College-Milwaukee changed its name to Wisconsin State College of Milwaukee, which merged with the University of Wisconsin–Extension's Milwaukee branch five years later to form the present day University of Wisconsin–Milwaukee.

Notable alumni

 Ruth Asawa, Japanese American sculptor
 John C. Becher, American stage and television actor
 Allen Busby, teacher, attorney, Progressive state legislator and businessman
Florian Cajori, Swiss-American historian of mathematics
 Timothy T. Cronin, U.S. Attorney
 Frank A. Dudley, American lawyer, politician, hotelier and business owner
 Dorothy Fuldheim, American journalist and anchor, "First Lady of Television News"
 Paul C. Gartzke, former Presiding Judge of the Wisconsin Court of Appeals
 Warren Giese, former South Carolina state legislator and college football coach
 Herschel Burke Gilbert, composer of film and television theme songs
 Frederick Hemke, American saxophonist and former Professor of Music at Northwestern University School of Music
 Marguerite Henry,  American writer of children's books
 Clara Stanton Jones, the first African American president of the American Library Association
 Frank Tenney Johnson, painter of the AmericaWest
 John Kaney, Wisconsin State Assemblyman
 Ken Kranz, former NFL football player
 Golda Meir, former Prime Minister of Israel
 Paul Meyers, professional football player
 Clem Neacy, NFL football player
 Mark Ryan, Wisconsin State Assemblyman
 Virginia Satir ('36 BA Education) noted author and psychotherapist
 Douglas C. Steltz, Wisconsin State Assemblyman
 George H. Sutton, professional billiard player, the "handless billiard player"
 Whitey Wolter, NFL football player

Notable faculty
Herbert Eugene Bolton, American historian
Lorenzo D. Harvey, President 1892–1898 
J. Martin Klotsche, President 1946–1956
Guy Penwell, long time men's basketball coach from 1930–1942 and 1946–1952
Russ Rebholz, head basketball coach  1952–1956
W Otto Miessner, American composer and music educator
S. Anna Gordon, first principal of the State Normal school of Wisconsin.

See also
 History of the University of Wisconsin–Milwaukee.

References

Further reading
"A Brief History of the University of Wisconsin–Milwaukee", by George M. Richard, 1960
"UWM Buildings: Some Pertinent Facts", prepared by Donald A. Woods, 1968

Universities and colleges in Milwaukee
University of Wisconsin–Milwaukee
Educational institutions established in 1885
1885 establishments in Wisconsin